Kittel is a surname and given name. Notable people with the name include:
 Kittel Halvorson (1846–1936), a U.S. Representative from Minnesota
 Adolf Kittel, Czech middle-distance runner
 Bertold Kittel (pl)
 Bruno Kittel (1922–?), Nazi officer
 Bruno Kittel (conductor) (1870–1948), German violinist and conductor (de)
 Caspar Kittel (1603–1639), a German composer
 Charles Kittel (1916-2019), American physicist
 Christoph Kittel (fl. 1640-1680), German organist
 Elżbieta Zawadowska-Kittel (pl)
 Emmy Kittel (1878–1930), Czech operatic soprano
 Eugen Kittel (1859–1946), German engineer (de)
 Ferdinand Kittel (1832–1903), German priest, missionary and indologist
 August Wilson (1945–2005) (born Frederick August Kittel), American playwright
 Gerhard Kittel (1888–1948), German theologian and lexicographer of biblical languages
 Heinrich Kittel (1892–1969), German officer
  (1902–1984), German theologian
 Hermine Kittel (1879–1948), Austrian singer
 Johann Christian Kittel (1732–1809), German composer
 Kaspar Kittel, the composer also known as Caspar Kittel (see above)
 Marcel Kittel (born 1988), German cyclist
 Marlon Kittel (born 1983), German actor
 Martin Baldwin Kittel (1796–1885)
 Nicolaus Kittel (1830s–1870), German-Russian bow maker
 Otto Kittel (1917–1945), Silesian-German World War II pilot
 Rudolf Kittel (1853–1929), German Old Testament scholar
 Jan Bedřich Kittl/Johann Friedrich Kittl

See also 
 Kittle (disambiguation)
 Kittlová

German-language surnames
Jewish surnames